Stope is a settlement at the northern end of the Mišja Valley (Mišja dolina) southwest of Rašica in the Municipality of Velike Lašče in central Slovenia. The entire municipality is part of the traditional region of Lower Carniola and is now included in the Central Slovenia Statistical Region.

References

External links
Stope on Geopedia

Populated places in the Municipality of Velike Lašče